Frank Van Tuyl Phillips (April 7, 1912 – April 12, 1994) was an American cinematographer. He was born in 1912 in San Bernardino, California. He was a director of photography and Disney and MGM Studios. His credits at MGM included Singing in the Rain and Giant.  His Disney credits included Bedknobs and Broomsticks, Pete's Dragon, and Escape to Witch Mountain. He was nominated for an Academy Award for his work on The Black Hole. He also worked in television and received an Emmy nomination for his work on Hawaii 5-0. 

In 1965, he was involved in a boating accident that killed Robert King Baggott, second cameraman, during the production of Lt. Robin Crusoe, USN (1966).

Phillips died in 1994 in Arizona.

Filmography
Wild Wild Winter (1966)
Mosby's Marauders (1967)
The Young Loner (TV) (1968)
The One and Only, Genuine, Original Family Band (1968)
The Computer Wore Tennis Shoes (1969)
Darker than Amber (1970)
The Wild Country (1970)
Scandalous John (1970)
Bedknobs and Broomsticks (1971)
Now You See Him, Now You Don't (1972)
Snowball Express (1972)
The World's Greatest Athlete (1973)
Herbie Rides Again (1974)
The Island at the Top of the World (1974)
Escape to Witch Mountain (1975)
The Apple Dumpling Gang (1975)
No Deposit, No Return (1976)
Treasure of Matecumbe (1976)
Gus (1976)
The Shaggy D.A. (1976)
Pete's Dragon (1977)
Return from Witch Mountain (1978)
Hot Lead and Cold Feet (1978)
Goin' Coconuts (1978)
The Apple Dumpling Gang Rides Again (1979)
The Black Hole (1979)
Midnight Madness (1980)
Herbie Goes Bananas (1980)
Going Ape! (1981)
Return of the Beverly Hillbillies (TV) (1981)
The Ambush Murders (TV) (1982)
Big Bird in China (TV) (1983) (uncredited)

References

External links
American Cinematographer, Vol. 75.
 
 The 12 O'Clock High Logbook: The Unofficial History of the Novel, Motion Picture, and TV Series by Allan T. Duffin, Paul Matheis. Bear Manor Media, 2005.

1912 births
1994 deaths
American cinematographers
Disney people
People from Illinois